The geology of Georgia consists of four distinct geologic regions, beginning in the northwest corner of the state and moving through the state to the southeast:  the Valley and Ridge region and part of the Appalachian Plateau; the Blue Ridge; the Piedmont and the Coastal Plain. The Fall Line is the boundary between the Piedmont and the Coastal Plain.

Appalachian Plateau and Valley and Ridge
The Appalachian Plateau and the Valley and Ridge geologic region passes through the extreme northwest corner of Georgia.  During the middle Ordovician Period (about 440 - 460 million years ago), the tectonic plate carrying this area collided with another plate, leading to the creation of a new subduction zone and the beginning of the Appalachians. As a result of this and later orogenies, alternating beds of hard and soft Paleozoic sedimentary rocks were folded, looking much like the wrinkles one would find in a kicked floor rug. In Georgia, the Valley and Ridge includes limestone, sandstone, shale and other sedimentary rocks, which have yielded construction-grade limestone, barite, ochre and small amounts of coal. The extent of the Valley and Ridge is bound by the Carters Dam fault in the east and the Emerson Fault in the south. Extreme northwestern Georgia is underlain by relatively undeformed, nearly flat-lying Carboniferous strata, and is known as the Appalachian Plateau.

Blue Ridge
The Blue Ridge geologic region forms the North Georgia mountains.  In this region, the highest points in Georgia are found, including Brasstown Bald.  The Blue Ridge consists of metamorphic rocks, either metamorphosed equivalents of sedimentary rocks or igneous rocks, and the region includes the metavolcanic rocks of the Georgia Gold Belt. The region also includes igneous intrusions of granite and diabase.  From the discovery of gold in the Georgia Gold Belt in 1828, enough gold was mined in the area to cause a branch mint of the United States Mint to be located in Dahlonega, Georgia.  Marble and talc are other resources produced in the Blue Ridge in Georgia.

Piedmont
The Piedmont geologic region is composed of igneous and metamorphic rocks resulting from ancient (300- to 600-million-year-old) sediments that were subjected to high temperatures and pressures and re-exposed about 250 to 300 million years ago. Rocks typical of the region include schist, amphibolite, gneiss, migmatite, and granite. This region is more hilly than mountainous and is marked by lower elevations than the Blue Ridge.  Nevertheless, the Piedmont is home to prominent features like Stone Mountain and the Brevard Fault line which runs parallel to the Chattahoochee River and bisects cities like Suwanee, Atlanta, Buford, and Duluth.

Coastal Plain

The Coastal Plain in Georgia is part of a geologic region that extends from New Jersey to Texas and consists of sedimentary rocks deposited in the Late Cretaceous to Holocene periods. It is divided from the Piedmont by the Fall Line, which passes through Georgia from Augusta in the east, then southwestward to Macon, then to Columbus and finally westward to Montgomery, Alabama.  The Sandhills or Carolina Sandhills is a 10–35 mi (16–56 km) wide region within the Atlantic Coastal Plain province, along the inland margin of the Coastal Plain province.  The rocks in the Coastal Plain region are from the Late Cretaceous to Holocene periods, with some marine and terrestrial fossils and rare fragments of dinosaurs. The main mineral resource of the Coastal Plain in Georgia is kaolin.

See also
Geologic mapping of Georgia (U.S. state)
Geology of the Appalachians
Geology of the United States
List of mountains in Georgia (U.S. state)

References

External links
 

 
Georgia
Natural history of Georgia (U.S. state)